"Lovely One" is a funk single released by American family group the Jacksons on September 27, 1980.

Released as the first single from the brothers' Triumph, it followed the hit "Shake Your Body (Down to the Ground)". "Lovely One" nearly matched the success of the previous song, reaching number twelve on the Billboard Hot 100, number two on the Black Singles chart, and, along with the tracks "Can You Feel It" and "Walk Right Now", it hit number one on the dance chart for one week.

Record World praised Michael Jackson's lead vocal performance.

Credits
Written and composed by Michael Jackson and Randy Jackson
Produced by the Jacksons
Arrangement by Michael Jackson and Tom Tom 84
Lead vocals by Michael Jackson
Background vocals by the Jacksons: Jackie Jackson, Tito Jackson, Randy Jackson and Marlon Jackson
Instrumentation:
Keyboards: Greg Phillinganes
Guitars: Tito Jackson, David Williams, Mike Sembello
Bass: Nathan Watts
Drums: Ollie E. Brown
Percussion: Paulinho da Costa

Charts

References

External links
Genius: Lovely One - Lyrics

1980 singles
The Jackson 5 songs
Songs written by Michael Jackson
Songs written by Randy Jackson (The Jacksons)
1980 songs
Epic Records singles